Blindgangers  is a 1977 Dutch drama film directed by Ate de Jong.

Cast
Ansje Beentjes	as Danielle
Jimmy Berghout as aPaul
Diana Dobbelman as Doctor
Ben Hulsman as Fons
Michiel Kerbosch as Soldier
Wim Kouwenhoven as Policeman
Maroesja Lacunes as Anette
Derek de Lint as Mark
Emile van Moerkerken as Blind Man
Lettie Oosthoek as Joke

External links 
 

1977 films
1970s Dutch-language films
1977 drama films
Dutch drama films
Films directed by Ate de Jong